Woody Williams is an American retired baseball pitcher.

Woody Williams may also refer to:

Woody Williams (infielder) (1912–1995), American baseball player
Woody Williams (pitcher, born 1918) (1918–1990), American baseball player
Hershel W. Williams (1923–2022), World War II Medal of Honor recipient